The Bredeney Ladies Open is a tournament for professional female tennis players on outdoor clay courts. The event is classified as a $25,000 (€21,136) ITF Women's Circuit tournament and has been held in Essen, Germany, since 2013.

Past finals

Singles

Doubles

External links 
 ITF search
 Official website 

ITF Women's World Tennis Tour
Clay court tennis tournaments
Tennis tournaments in Germany
Recurring sporting events established in 2013
2013 establishments in Germany